Maltagorea is a genus of moths in the family Saturniidae first described by Thierry Bouyer in 1993.

Species
Maltagorea andriai (Griveaud, 1962)
Maltagorea ankaratra (Viette, 1954)
Maltagorea altivola Basquin, 2013
Maltagorea ambahona Basquin, 2013
Maltagorea auricolor (Mabille, 1879)
Maltagorea basquini Rougerie, 2003
Maltagorea cincta (Mabille, 1879)
Maltagorea dentata (Griveaud, 1962)
Maltagorea dubiefi Bouyer, 2006
Maltagorea dura (Keferstein, 1870)
Maltagorea fusicolor (Mabille, 1879)
Maltagorea griveaudi Bouyer, 1996
Maltagorea madagascariensis (Sonthonnax, 1901)
Maltagorea monsarrati (Griveaud, 1968)
Maltagorea ornata (Griveaud, 1962)
Maltagorea pseudomariae Basquin, 2013
Maltagorea rostaingi (Griveaud, 1962)
Maltagorea rubriflava (Griveaud, 1962)
Maltagorea sogai (Griveaud, 1962)
Maltagorea vulpina (Butler, 1880)

References

Saturniinae
Moth genera